Joypurhat Government College is the highest educational institution of  Joypurhat. The college was established 1963 and is located near Joypurhat railway station. The college was nationalized in 1980. It is a National University College with the college code 2801.

Departments
 Department of Accounting
 Department of Bangla
 Department of Botany
 Department of Economics
 Department of English
 Department of Islamic History & Culture
 Department of Management
 Department of Mathematics
 Department of Philosophy
 Department of Physics
 Department of Political Science
 Department of Zoology
 Department of Chemistry

See also
 Board of Intermediate and Secondary Education, Rajshahi

References

External links 

Colleges in Joypurhat District
Universities and colleges in Joypurhat District
Educational institutions established in 1963
1963 establishments in East Pakistan